OneTel may refer to:

One.Tel Limited (ACN 068 193 153).
Onetel Communication Ltd., PSTN operator in Bangladesh.